Road Rules: Down Under is the sixth season of the MTV reality television series Road Rules. It took place exclusively in Hawaii for part of the first episode, with the rest of the season exclusively in Oceania. This season is often noted as Road Rules: Australia.

Cast

Missions

Episodes

After filming
Susie returned to the series as part of the alumni cast of Road Rules 2007: Viewers' Revenge. In 2009, while filming season 18 of The Challenge, she met Adam Butler, who then worked as a crew member. The couple ended up getting married and has now a son. On September 8, 2015, Meister and Sarah Rice from The Real World: Brooklyn released their first episode of The Brain Candy Podcast. The podcast is part of Wave Podcast Network co-created by Susie and her husband.

In 2008, Christina Pazsitzky married Tom Segura. Together they have two children: Ellis (born in 2016) and Julian (born in 2018).Christina has also achieved the titles of, Main Mommy, Water Champ, and Personality Champ.

Chadwick Pelletier married Road Rules: Maximum Velocity Tour cast member Holly Brentson.

The Challenge

Challenge in bold indicates that the contestant was a finalist on the Challenge.

References

1998 American television seasons
Road Rules
Television shows filmed in Australia
Television shows filmed in Hawaii